Shimpoo Pimpoo is the debut studio album by the Croatian alternative rock band Pips, Chips & Videoclips. The album was originally released in December 1993 in Compact Cassette format. It was later re-released in CD format in March 1996, following interest generated by the success of their second studio album Dernjava released in 1995. All the tracks from Shimpoo Pimpoo were recorded in the period between November 1991 and September 1993 and produced by Denyken.

The album features two songs previously released in April 1992 as an advance double single (Dinamo ja volim/Krumpira) and which were the band's first two studio recordings. Three videos were also recorded for tracks from the album - "Gume na kotačima", "Krumpira" and "Mala fufica".

Track listing
"Reci svim svojim frendicama"
"Dinamo ja volim"
"Gume na kotačima"
"Tintilinti"
"Brendon & Brenda song"
"Mala fufica"
"Prvi joint u ustima"
"Ja sam sve što vole mladi"
"Krumpira"
"Eustahije"
"Jug"
"Dinamo ja volim (unplugged)"

References

External links
Pips, Chips & Videoclips discography 

1993 debut albums
Pips, Chips & Videoclips albums